The  is an national expressway in the southern part of Hiroshima Prefecture. The route connects the city of Higashihiroshima and the San'yō Expressway to the city of Kure on the coast of the Seto Inland Sea. It is owned and operated primarily by the Ministry of Land, Infrastructure, Transport and Tourism (MLIT). The route is signed E75 under MLIT's  "2016 Proposal for Realization of Expressway Numbering."

Route description
The Higashihiroshima-Kure Expressway was built to relieve traffic along Japan National Route 375 between the cities of Higashihiroshima and Kure. Once the expressway was completed, travel time along the corridor was cut from 90 minutes to 40 minutes.

The speed limit is 80 km/h for the entire route.

Junction list
The entire expressway is in Hiroshima Prefecture.
|colspan="8" style="text-align: center;"|Through to Higashihiroshima-Takata Road

References

External links
 Ministry of Land, Infrastructure and Transport: Higashihiroshima-Kure Expressway

Expressways in Japan
Roads in Hiroshima Prefecture